A Smooth Jazz Christmas is the sixth studio album by saxophone player Dave Koz. Koz's second holiday album was released by Capitol Records on September 25, 2001. Friends include David Benoit, Rick Braun, Kenny Loggins, Brenda Russell, and Peter White.

Track listing

Personnel
 Dave Koz - Saxophones
 David Benoit - Piano
 Rick Braun - Trumpet, Flugelhorn
 Kenny Loggins - Vocal
 Brenda Russell - Vocal
 Peter White - Acoustic Guitar, Accordion
 Bridgette Bryant - Background vocal
 Paul Jackson Jr. - Guitar
 Brian Kilgore - Percussion
 Nick Lane - Tenor and Bass Trombone
 Esterlee Nicholson - Background vocal
 Bill Sharpe - Bass
 Sandy Simmons - Background vocal
 Brian Simpson - Keyboards, Piano
 Stevo Théard - Drums

Charts

References

Dave Koz albums
Capitol Records Christmas albums
Christmas albums by American artists
Instrumental albums
2001 Christmas albums
Jazz Christmas albums